
The International Society for Nanoscale Science, Computation, and Engineering (ISNSCE, pronounced like "essence") is a scientific society specializing in nanotechnology and DNA computing.  It was started in 2004 by Nadrian Seeman, founder of the field of DNA nanotechnology.  According to the society, its purpose is "to promote the study of the control of the arrangement of the atoms in matter, examine the principles that lead to such control, to develop tools and methods to increase such control, and to investigate the use of these principles for molecular computation, and for engineering on the finest possible scales."

ISNSCE sponsors two academic conferences each year: the first is Foundations of Nanoscience (FNANO), and the second is the International Conference on DNA Computing and Molecular Computation (DNA Computing).  The FNANO conference has been held in Snowbird, Utah each year in April since 2004, and focuses on molecular self-assembly of nanoscale materials and devices.  DNA Computing focuses on biomolecular computing and DNA nanotechnology, and has been held annually since 1995.  The proceedings of DNA Computing are published as part of the Lecture Notes in Computer Science book series.

Awards
ISNSCE sponsors two awards annually.  The ISNSCE Nanoscience Prize recognizes research in any area of nanoscience, and has been presented at FNANO each year since 2007.  The Tulip Award in DNA Computing is specific to the fields of biomolecular computing and molecular programming, and has been presented at the DNA Computing conference since 2000.  ISNSCE also sponsors two student awards for papers presented at the DNA Computing conference each year.

The Tulip Award was first given at the sixth DNA Computing conference, in Leiden, the Netherlands, whose botanical garden is known as the birthplace of the tulip culture in the Netherlands.

In April 2015, ISNCSE established the Robert Dirks Molecular Programming Prize to recognize early-career scientists for molecular programming research.  The award was established in memory of Dirks, who was one of the six fatalities of the February 2015 Valhalla train crash.

ISNSCE Nanoscience Prize

The following are recipients of the ISNSCE Nanoscience Prize:

Tulip Award in DNA Computing

The following are recipients of the Tulip Award in DNA Computing:

See also
 Kavli Prize in Nanoscience
 Foresight Institute Feynman Prize in Nanotechnology
 IEEE Pioneer Award in Nanotechnology

References

External links
 International Society for Nanoscale Science, Computation, and Engineering
 Foundations of Nanoscience conference
 International Conference on DNA Computing and Molecular Programming

International scientific organizations
Nanotechnology institutions